XULJet was an open-source JavaScript framework for the Mozilla XULRunner run-time environment. It is intended for writing desktop applications in pure JavaScript.

XULJet provides a component architecture and user interface elements description inspired by Seaside. It implements some CommonJS specifications.

Examples
Hello world in XULJet:
var xuljet = require("lib/xuljet")

var Main = function(aWindow) {
  xuljet.Component.call(this, aWindow)
  this.message = "Hello World!"
}
xuljet.inherits(Main, xuljet.Component)

Main.prototype.render = function(xul) {
  xul.vbox(
    { flex: 1 },
    xul.toolbox(
      xul.menubar(
        xul.menu(
          { label: "File", accesskey: "f" },
          xul.menupopup(
            xul.menuitem({ label: "Close", oncommand: "window.close()" }))))),
    xul.vbox(
      { align: "center", pack: "center", flex: 1 },
      xul.description({ bind: "desc" }, "Press the button"),
      xul.button({
        label: "OK",
        oncommand: function() {
          this["desc"].value = this.message
        }
      })),
    xul.statusbar(xul.statusbarpanel({ flex: 1, label: "Ready..." }))
  )
}

function main() {
  var rootComponent = new Main(window)
  window.setTitle("XULJet")
  rootComponent.beMainWindowComponent()
}

See also
 JavaScript
 XUL
 XULRunner
 CommonJS

References

External links

Javascript Libraries
XULJet mailing list - general discussion about XULJet

JavaScript libraries